Lee Teng-hui (15 January 192330 July 2020) was a Taiwanese statesman and agriculturist who served as President of the Republic of China (Taiwan) under the 1947 Constitution and chairman of the Kuomintang (KMT) from 1988 to 2000. He was the first president to be born in Taiwan, the last to be indirectly elected and the first to be directly elected. During his presidency, Lee oversaw the end of martial law and the full democratization of the ROC, advocated the Taiwanese localization movement, and led an ambitious foreign policy to gain allies around the world. Nicknamed "Mr. Democracy", Lee was credited as the president who completed Taiwan's transition to the democratic era.

After leaving office, he remained active in Taiwanese politics. Lee was considered the "spiritual leader" of the pro-independence Taiwan Solidarity Union (TSU), and recruited for the party in the past. After Lee campaigned for TSU candidates in the 2001 Taiwanese legislative election, he was expelled by the KMT. Other activities that Lee engaged in included maintaining relations with former Taiwanese President Chen Shui-bian and Japan.

Early life and education

Lee was born in the rural farming community of Sanshi Village, Taihoku Prefecture, Japanese Taiwan. He is of Yongding, Tingzhou Hakka descent. As a child, he often dreamed of traveling abroad, and became an avid stamp collector. Growing up under Japanese colonial rule, he developed a strong interest in Japan. Lee—one of only four Taiwanese students in his  class—graduated with honors and was given a scholarship to Japan's Kyoto Imperial University.

During his school days, he learned kendo and bushido. A lifelong collector of books, Lee was heavily influenced by Japanese thinkers like Nitobe Inazō and Kitaro Nishida in Kyoto. In 1944, he too volunteered for service in the Imperial Japanese Army and became a second lieutenant, in command of an anti-aircraft gun in Taiwan. He was ordered back to Japan in 1945 and participated in the clean-up after the Great Tokyo Air Raid of March 1945. Lee stayed in Japan after the surrender and graduated from Kyoto Imperial University in 1946.

After World War II ended, and the Republic of China took over Taiwan, Lee enrolled in the National Taiwan University, where in 1948 he earned a bachelor's degree in agricultural science. Lee joined the Chinese Communist Party (CCP) for two stints, in September 1946 and October or November 1947, both times briefly. This group was absorbed by the CCP, and Lee officially left the party in September 1948. In a 2002 interview, Lee himself admitted that he had been a Communist; Lee remains the only Taiwanese president known to have once been a member of the Chinese Communist Party. In that same interview, Lee said that he had strongly opposed Communism for a long time because he understood the theory well and knew that it was doomed to fail. Lee stated that he joined the Communists out of hatred for the KMT.

In 1953, Lee received a master's degree in agricultural economics from the Iowa State University (ISU) in the United States. Lee returned to Taiwan in 1957 as an economist with the Joint Commission on Rural Reconstruction (JCRR), an organization sponsored by the U.S. which aimed at modernizing Taiwan's agricultural system and at land reform. During this period, he also worked as an adjunct professor in the Department of Economics at National Taiwan University and taught at the Graduate School of East Asian Studies at National Chengchi University.

In the mid-1960s, Lee returned to the United States, and earned a PhD in agricultural economics from Cornell University in 1968. His advisor was John Williams Mellor. His doctoral dissertation, Intersectoral Capital Flows in the Economic Development of Taiwan, 1895–1960  (published as a book under the same name) was honored as the year's best doctoral thesis by the American Association of Agricultural Economics and remains an influential work on Taiwan's economy during the Japanese and early KMT periods.

Lee encountered Christianity as a young man and in 1961 was baptised. For most of the rest of his political career, despite holding high office, Lee made a habit of giving sermons at churches around Taiwan, mostly on apolitical themes of service and humility. He was a member of the Presbyterian Church in Taiwan.

Lee's native language was Taiwanese Hokkien. He was proficient in both Mandarin and Japanese and was able to speak well in English. It has been claimed that he was more proficient in Japanese than he was in Mandarin.

Rise to power
Shortly after returning to Taiwan, Lee joined the KMT in 1971 and was made a cabinet minister without portfolio responsible for agriculture.

In 1978, Lee was appointed mayor of Taipei, where he solved water shortages and improved the city's irrigation problems. In 1981, he became governor of Taiwan Province and made further irrigation improvements.

As a skilled technocrat, Lee soon caught the eye of President Chiang Ching-kuo as a strong candidate to serve as vice president. Chiang sought to move more authority to the bensheng ren (residents of Taiwan before 1949 and their descendants) instead of continuing to promote waisheng ren (mainland Chinese immigrants who arrived in Taiwan after 1949 and their descendants) as his father had. President Chiang nominated Lee to become his Vice President. Lee was formally elected by the National Assembly in 1984.

Presidency
Chiang Ching-kuo died in January 1988 and Lee succeeded him as president. The "Palace Faction" of the KMT, a group of conservative mainlanders headed by General Hau Pei-tsun, Premier Yu Kuo-hwa, and Education Minister Lee Huan, as well as Chiang Kai-shek's widow, Soong Mei-ling, were deeply distrustful of Lee and sought to block his accession to the KMT chairmanship and sideline him as a figurehead. With the help of James Soong—himself a member of the Palace Faction—who quieted the hardliners with the famous plea "Each day of delay is a day of disrespect to Ching-kuo," Lee was allowed to ascend to the chairmanship unobstructed. At the 13th National Congress of Kuomintang in July 1988, Lee named 31 members of the Central Committee, 16 of whom were bensheng ren: for the first time, bensheng ren held a majority in what was then a powerful policy-making body. On 20 March, he ordered to release the political prisoner, Gen. Sun Li-jen from 33 years of house arrest. In August, he listened to the aboriginal legislator Tsai Chung-han's advocacy in the General Assembly of Legislative Yuan and the journalism reportage of Independence Evening Post on the human rights' concern to release the remaining survivors of the civilian Tanker Tuapse free after 34 years in captivity.

As he consolidated power during the early years of his presidency, Lee allowed his rivals within the KMT to occupy positions of influence: when Yu Guo-hwa retired as premier in 1989, he was replaced by Lee Huan, who was succeeded by Hau Pei-tsun in 1990. At the same time, Lee made a major reshuffle of the Executive Yuan, as he had done with the KMT Central Committee, replacing several elderly waishengren with younger benshengren, mostly of technical backgrounds. Fourteen of these new appointees, like Lee, had been educated in the United States. Prominent among the appointments were Lien Chan as foreign minister and Shirley Kuo as finance minister.

1990 saw the arrival of the Wild Lily student movement on behalf of full democracy for Taiwan. Thousands of Taiwanese students demonstrated for democratic reforms. The demonstrations culminated in a sit-in demonstration by over 300,000 students at Memorial Square in Taipei. Students called for direct elections of the national president and vice president and for a new election for all legislative seats. On 21 March, Lee welcomed some of the students to the Presidential Building. He expressed his support of their goals and pledged his commitment to full democracy in Taiwan.

In May 1991, Lee spearheaded a drive to eliminate the Temporary Provisions Effective During the Period of Communist Rebellion, laws put in place following the KMT arrival in 1949 that suspended the democratic functions of the government. In December 1991, the original members of the Legislative Yuan, elected to represent mainland China constituencies in 1948, were forced to resign and new elections were held to apportion more seats to the bensheng ren. The elections forced Hau Pei-tsun from the premiership, a position he was given in exchange for his tacit support of Lee. He was replaced by Lien Chan, then an ally of Lee.

The prospect of the first island-wide democratic election the next year, together with Lee's June 1995 visit to Cornell University, sparked the Third Taiwan Strait Crisis. The previous eight presidents and vice presidents of the ROC had been elected by the members of the National Assembly. For the first time, the President of the ROC would be elected by majority vote of Taiwan's population. The PRC conducted a series of missile tests in the waters surrounding Taiwan and other military maneuvers off the coast of Fujian in response to what Communist Party leaders described as moves by Lee to "split the motherland". The PRC government launched another set of tests just days before the election, sending missiles over the island to express its dissatisfaction should the Taiwanese people vote for Lee. The military actions disrupted trade and shipping lines and caused a temporary dip in the Asian stock market. Ironically, the 1996 missile launches boosted support for Lee instead. Lee's overall stance on Taiwanese independence during the election cycle was characterized as "deliberately vague".

On 23 March 1996, Lee became the first popularly elected ROC president with 54% of the vote. Many people who worked or resided in other countries made special trips back to the island to vote. In addition to the president, the governor of Taiwan Province and the mayors of Taipei and Kaohsiung (as leaders of provincial level divisions they were formerly appointed by the president) became popularly elected.

Lee, in an interview that same year, expressed his view that a special state-to-state relationship existed between Taiwan and the People's Republic of China (PRC) that all negotiations between the two sides of the Strait needed to observe. As president, he attempted to further reform the government. Controversially, he attempted to remove the provincial level of government and proposed that lower level government officials be appointed, not elected.

Lee, observing constitutional term limits he had helped enact, stepped down from the presidency at the end of his term in 2000. That year, Democratic Progressive Party candidate Chen Shui-bian won the national election with 39% of the vote in a three-way race. Chen's victory marked an end to KMT rule and the first peaceful transfer of power in Taiwan's new democratic system.

Supporters of rival candidates Lien Chan and James Soong accused Lee of setting up the split in the KMT that had enabled Chen to win. Lee had promoted the uncharismatic Lien over the popular Soong as the KMT candidate. Soong had subsequently run as an independent and was expelled from the KMT. The number of votes garnered by both Soong and Lien would have accounted for approximately 60% of the vote while individually the candidates placed behind Chen. Protests were staged in front of the KMT party headquarters in Taipei. Fuelling this anger were the persistent suspicions following Lee throughout his presidency that he secretly supported Taiwan independence and that he was intentionally sabotaging the Kuomintang from above. Lee resigned his chairmanship on 24 March.

During his presidency, Lee supported the Taiwanese localization movement. The Taiwanization movement has its roots in Japanese rule founded during the Japanese era and sought to put emphasis on vernacular Taiwanese culture in Taiwan as the center of people's lives as opposed to Nationalist China. During the Chiang era, China was promoted as the center of an ideology that would build a Chinese national outlook in a people who had once considered themselves Japanese subjects. Taiwan was often relegated to a backwater province of China in the KMT-supported history books. People were discouraged from studying local Taiwanese customs, which were to be replaced by mainstream Chinese customs. Lee sought to turn Taiwan into a center rather than an appendage.  In 1997, he presided over the adoption of the Taiwan-centric history textbook Knowing Taiwan.

South China Sea dispute
Under Lee, it was stated that "legally, historically, geographically, or in reality", all of the South China Sea and Spratly islands were the territory of the Republic of China and under ROC sovereignty, and denounced actions undertaken there by Malaysia and the Philippines, in a statement on 13 July 1999 released by the foreign ministry of Taiwan. The claims made by both the PRC and the Republic of China "mirror" each other. During international talks involving the Spratly islands, the PRC and ROC have sometimes made efforts to coordinate their positions with each other since both have the same claims.

Post-presidency
Since resigning the chairmanship of the KMT, Lee stated a number of political positions and ideas which he did not mention while he was president, but which he appeared to have privately maintained. After Lee endorsed the candidates of the newly formed Pan-Green Taiwan Solidarity Union, a party established by a number of his KMT allies, Lee was expelled from the KMT on 21 September 2001.

Lee publicly supported the Name Rectification Campaigns in Taiwan and proposed changing the name of the country from the Republic of China to the Republic of Taiwan. He generally opposed unlimited economic ties with the PRC, placing restrictions on Taiwanese wishing to invest in the mainland.

After Chen Shui-bian succeeded Lee in the 2000 election, the two enjoyed a close relationship despite being from different political parties. Chen regularly asked Lee for advice during his first term in office. In Chen's 2001 book, he called Lee the "Father of Taiwanese Democracy" and also named himself the "Son of Taiwan" with respect to Lee. However, the two's relationship began to worsen when Lee questioned Chen's reform of the fisheries branch of the Council of Agriculture. Though Lee was present in the 228 Hand-in-Hand rally orchestrated by the Pan-Green Coalition before the 2004 election, the two's relationship broke apart after Chen asked James Soong to be the President of the Executive Yuan in 2005, which Lee disagreed with. Lee also publicly criticized Chen in 2006 by calling him incapable and corrupt.

In February 2007, Lee shocked the media when he revealed that he did not support Taiwanese independence, when he was widely seen as the spiritual leader of the pro-independence movement. Lee also said that he supported opening up trade and tourism with the mainland, a position he had opposed before. Lee later explained that Taiwan already enjoys de facto independence and that political maneuvering over details of expressing it is counterproductive. He maintains that "Taiwan should seek 'normalization' by changing its name and amending its constitution."

Relations with Japan
Lee enjoyed a warm relationship with the people and culture of Japan. Taiwan was under Japanese rule from 1895 to 1945 and natives of the island who grew up in that period, such as Lee, attended schools where Japanese language, songs, and stories were taught. Lee's father was a middle-level Japanese police aide; his elder brother died serving in the Imperial Japanese Navy in World War II and is listed in the Yasukuni Shrine in Tokyo. During his youth, Lee had a Japanese name, . This name was suggested by Lee Teng-chin, combining Longyan, where there family originated, and their surname Lee, which shares the same pronunciation with the character “” in both Japanese on'yomi and Chinese. Lee spoke fondly of his upbringing and his teachers and was welcomed in visits to Japan since leaving office. Lee admired and enjoyed all things Japanese such as traditional Japanese values. This was the target of criticism from the Pan-Blue Coalition in Taiwan, as well as from China, due to the anti-Japanese sentiment formed during and after World War II. However, this animosity fell in later years, especially in Taiwan.

In 1989, he received the highest distinction of the Scout Association of Japan, the Golden Pheasant Award.

In August 2001, Lee said of Junichiro Koizumi's controversial visit to Yasukuni Shrine, "It is natural for a premier of a country to commemorate the souls of people who lost their lives for their country." In a May 2007 trip to Japan, Lee visited the shrine himself to pay tribute to his elder brother. Controversy rose because the shrine also enshrines World War II Class A criminals among the other soldiers.

During the 2012 China anti-Japanese demonstrations, on 13 September 2012, Lee remarked, "The Senkaku Islands, no matter whether in the past, for now or in the future, certainly belong to Japan." Ten years previously, he had stated, "The Senkaku Islands are the territory of Japan." In September 2014, Lee expressed support for a Japanese equivalent to the United States' Taiwan Relations Act, which was discussed in the Japanese Diet in February, though the idea was first proposed by Chen Shui-bian in 2006.

In 2014, Lee said in the Japanese magazine SAPIO published by Shogakukan, "China spreads lies such as Nanjing massacre to the world ... Korea and China use invented history as their activity of propaganda for their country. Comfort women is the most remarkable example." In 2015, Lee said "The issue of Taiwanese comfort women is already solved" in the Japanese magazine Voice (published by PHP Institute), and was strongly criticized by Chen I-hsin, spokesman of the Presidential Office as "not ignorant but cold-blooded". Chen added, "If Lee Teng-hui really thinks the issue of comfort women is solved, go to a theater and see Song of the Reed."

In July 2015, Lee visited Japan, and again stated that Japan has full sovereignty over the Senkaku Islands. This was the first time Lee made remarks of this nature while in Japan. Members of the pan-Blue New Party and Kuomintang accused him of treason. New Party leader Yok Mu-ming filed charges of treason against Lee, while the KMT's Lai Shyh-bao called a caucus meeting to seek revisions to the Act Governing Preferential Treatment for Retired presidents and Vice presidents, aimed at denying Lee privileges as a former president.

Lee also stated, in 2015, that Taiwanese people were "subjects of Japan" and that Taiwan and Japan were "one country", sparking much criticism from both mainland China and the Pan-Blue Coalition.  In response to media requests for comment, then presidential candidate Tsai Ing-wen said that “each generation and ethnic group in Taiwan has lived a different history,” and that people should approach these differing experiences and interpretations with an attitude of understanding that will allow for learning from history, rather than allowing it to be used a tool for manipulating divisions.

Lee published a book, Remaining Life: My Life Journey and the Road of Taiwan's Democracy, in February 2016. In it, he reasserted support for Japanese sovereignty claims over the Senkaku Islands, drawing complaints from the ROC Presidential Office, President-elect Tsai Ing-wen, and Yilan County fishermen.

On 22 June 2018, he visited Japan for the final time in his life.

Controversies

Indictment
On 30 June 2011, Lee, along with former KMT financier Liu Tai-ying were indicted on graft and money-laundering charges and accused of embezzling US$7.79 million in public funds. He was acquitted by the Taipei District Court on 15 November 2013. Prosecutors appealed the ruling, but on 20 August 2014, Lee was cleared of the charges again.

Personal life

Lee and his wife were Presbyterian Christians.

Family
Lee married Tseng Wen-hui on 9 February 1949, with whom he had three children. Their firstborn son Lee Hsien-wen (c. 1950 – 21 March 1982) died of sinus cancer. Daughters Anna and Annie, were born c. 1952 and c. 1954, respectively.

Health
Shortly after stepping down from the presidency in 2000, Lee had coronary artery bypass surgery. In late 2011, he underwent surgery to remove stage II colon adenocarcinoma, the most common form of colon cancer. Two years later, he had a stent implanted in his vertebral artery following an occlusion. Lee was sent to Taipei Veterans General Hospital in November 2015 after experiencing numbness in his right hand, and later diagnosed with a minor stroke. On 29 November 2018, he was rushed to Taipei Veterans General Hospital after falling and hitting his head. He was discharged from hospital on 31 January 2019, and President Tsai Ing-wen later visited him at his home. On 8 February 2020, Lee was hospitalised at Taipei Veterans General Hospital after choking while drinking milk and retained in the hospital under observation due to lung infection concerns. Later, he was diagnosed with aspiration pneumonia caused by pulmonary infiltration, and was subsequently intubated.

Death

Lee died of multiple organ failure and septic shock at Taipei Veterans General Hospital on 7:24 pm, 30 July 2020, at the age of 97.  He had suffered from infections and cardiac problems since he was admitted to hospital in February.

A state funeral was announced, while a memorial venue at the Taipei Guest House where people paid respects to Lee was opened to the public from 1 to 16 August 2020, after which Lee's body was cremated and his remains interred at Wuzhi Mountain Military Cemetery. All national flags at government institutions were placed at half-mast for three days.

Legacy
Lee had the nickname "Mr. Democracy" and Taiwan's "Father of Democracy" for his actions to democratize Taiwan's government and his opposition to ruling Communists in mainland China.

Kuomintang members still blame Lee for losing the political party's long-term rule of the country and believe that Lee's moves led to the fragmentation of the KMT. On the other hand, the Democratic Progressive Party (DPP) views Lee positively as a beacon of hope. The DPP had grown in strength under Lee's rule and he set a precedent by presiding over the first ever peaceful transition of power to an opposition party in 2000.

A November 2020 phone survey of 1,076 Taiwan citizens aged 18 and above which asked the question: "Which president, after Taiwan's democratisation, do you think has the best leadership? Lee Teng-hui, Chen Shui-bian, Ma Ying-jeou, or Tsai Ing-wen?" revealed Lee topped the survey with 43 percent, with incumbent president Tsai on 32 percent, Ma on 18 percent and 6.6 percent for Chen.

Honours
:
 Grand Cordon of the Order of Brilliant Jade

Works
Books

See also

References

Further reading

Matray, James I., ed. East Asia and the United States: an encyclopedia of relations since 1784. Vol. 1 ( Greenwood, 2002) 1:346–347.

External links

Friends of Lee Teng-Hui Association
"Always in My Heart" —1995 lecture delivered at Cornell University Alumni Reunion
NSYSU Lee Teng-hui Center for Governmental Studies
Corpus of Political Speeches, publicly accessible with speeches from United States, Hong Kong, Taiwan, and China, provided by *Hong Kong Baptist University Library

|-

|-

|-

|-

 
1923 births
2020 deaths
20th-century Taiwanese politicians
Agricultural economists
Chairpersons of the Kuomintang
Chairpersons of the Taiwan Provincial Government
Chinese Communist Party politicians
Cornell University alumni
Expelled members of the Kuomintang
Former Marxists
Formosa Alliance
Hakka scientists
Iowa State University alumni
Imperial Japanese Army personnel of World War II
Kuomintang presidential nominees
Kyoto University alumni
Mayors of Taipei
Academic staff of the National Chengchi University
National Taiwan University alumni
Academic staff of the National Taiwan University
People from Yongding District, Longyan
Politicians of the Republic of China on Taiwan from New Taipei
Presidents of the Republic of China on Taiwan
Taiwan Solidarity Union politicians
Taiwanese agriculturalists
Taiwanese collaborators with Imperial Japan
20th-century Taiwanese economists
Taiwanese politicians of Hakka descent
Taiwanese Presbyterians
Vice presidents of the Republic of China on Taiwan
Heads of government who were later imprisoned
Imperial Japanese Army officers